Conasprella howelli is a species of sea snail, a marine gastropod mollusk in the family Conidae, the cone snails and their allies.

Like all species within the genus Conasprella, these cone snails are predatory and venomous. They are capable of "stinging", therefore live ones should be handled carefully or not at all.

Description

Distribution
This marine species occurs off New Zealand, New Caledonia and New South Wales, Australia at depths between 50 m and 290 m.

References

 Iredale, T. 1929. Mollusca from the continental shelf of eastern Australia. No. 2. Records of the Australian Museum 17(4): 157–189, pls 38–41 
 Iredale, T. 1931. Australian molluscan notes. No. 1. Records of the Australian Museum 18(4): 201–235, pls xxii–xxv
 Garrard, T.A. 1961. Mollusca collected by M. V. "Challenger" off the east coast of Australia. Journal of the Malacological Society of Australia 5: 3–38
 Wilson, B. 1994. Australian Marine Shells. Prosobranch Gastropods. Kallaroo, WA : Odyssey Publishing Vol. 2 370 pp.
 Röckel, D., Korn, W. & Kohn, A.J. 1995. Manual of the Living Conidae. Volume 1: Indo-Pacific Region. Wiesbaden : Hemmen 517 pp.
  Puillandre N., Duda T.F., Meyer C., Olivera B.M. & Bouchet P. (2015). One, four or 100 genera? A new classification of the cone snails. Journal of Molluscan Studies. 81: 1–23

External links
 The Conus Biodiversity website
 
 Seashells of New South Wales: Conus howelli

howelli
Gastropods described in 1929
Gastropods of New Zealand